Robert Gilmore is the name of:

Bob Gilmore (1961–2015), musicologist
Robert Gilmore of the band Pulley

See also
Robert Gillmor (1936–2022), artist and ornithologist
Robert Gilmour (disambiguation)
Gilmore (surname)